As-Suwayda Governorate is one of Syria's 14 governorates (provinces). It has an area of 5,550 km². Its capital and major town is As-Suwayda.

The governorate has a population of about 346,000 inhabitants (est. 2007).
The inhabitants of the governorate are predominantly Druze with Greek orthodox minority, there is also a small Muslim community.

Most of the inhabitants live in the western parts of the governorate, in Jabal al-Druze and Leja regions. Only nomadic Bedouin tribes live in the eastern parts, which constitute a barren rocky desert.

The governorate is divided into 3 districts (manatiq): As-Suwayda District, Salkhad District and Shahba District. These are further divided into 9 sub-districts (nawahi).

There are 3 cities, 124 villages and 36 hamlets in the governorate.

Footnotes

Populated places in as-Suwayda Governorate